Hed Mayner is an Israeli fashion designer that regularly presents his menswear collections in Paris fashion week, and winner of LVMH’s Karl Lagerfeld prize.

Early life and education 
Hed Mayner was born in Amuka in northern Israel. His mother is a painter and his father is a metalworker. He started his interest in fashion at the age of 16 and worked in leather, jewelry and hand sewing. At the age of 22 he started studying at the department of fashion and jewelry at Bezalel in Jerusalem and received his degree (with honors) in 2012. Mayner continued his fashion studies at Institut Français de la Mode in Paris.

Career 
Mayner returned to Israel and founded his brand in Tel-Aviv In 2015. In the same year he won a scholarship from Mifal HaPais. a year later he was one of the five Israeli designers who were featured in the  documentary series Fabric Stories, which was aired in yesDocu.

In 2017 Mayner became the first Israeli designer to present On the Official Calendar of Paris Fashion Week. Two years later he won the Karl Legerfeld prize by LVMH.

Designs 
Mayner’s menswear are characterized by unisex designs with wide cuts and custom-made items. According to Vogue magazine, his line is “Influenced by signature traditional Orthodox Jewish tailoring, (and) he infuses his military-inspired collections with a timeless spirit full of spirituality”.

External links 

 Hed Mayner's YouTube channel
 Hed Mayner's interview in Haaretz (in Hebrew)
 Hed Mayner on WWD
 Hed  Mayner the Israeli designer to follow, Le Monde article (in French)
 Hed Mayner - Fall 20222 menswear, Vogue
 Hed Mayner interview in Time Out Israel (in Hebrew)

References

Israeli fashion designers
Year of birth missing (living people)
Living people